Wada Shizuo (和田 静男) is a male Japanese popular music artist. He made his debut in 1973 as a member of Down Town Boogie-Woogie Band.

References

External links
  The official website of Shizuo Wada
 SIZ BAR'S WEB

Japanese male musicians
Living people
Year of birth missing (living people)
Place of birth missing (living people)